Leen may refer to:

Leen (given name)
Leen (surname)
River Leen, a river in England

See also
Leens, a village in the Dutch province of Groningen
Lean (disambiguation)